The 1941 South American Championships in Athletics were held in the Argentine capital, Buenos Aires, between 26 April and 4 May.

Medal summary

Men's events

Women's events

Medal table

External links
 Men Results – GBR Athletics
 Women Results – GBR Athletics
 Medallists

S
South American Championships in Athletics
 Sports competitions in Buenos Aires
1941 in South American sport
Athletics
Athletics